Shaoguan East railway station is a railway station in Zhenjiang District, Shaoguan, Guangdong, China. It is an intermediate stop on the Beijing–Guangzhou railway and the western terminus of the Ganzhou–Shaoguan railway.

History
On 15 December 2009, the name of this station was changed from Shaoguan to Shaoguan East. This was in preparation for the new Shaoguan railway station. In 2013, the station building was rebuilt.

References 

Railway stations in Guangdong